United States v. Briggs may refer to:

 United States v. Briggs (1847), in which the Supreme Court of the United States limited its jurisdiction to hear criminal certificates of division
 United States v. Briggs (2020), in which the Court held that the Uniform Code of Military Justice imposes no statute of limitations on rapes committed between 1986 and 2006